Tikkurila Upper Secondary School, abbreviated in Finnish as TILU,  is the largest high school in Finland, with about 1200 students from years 10 to 12. The school also offer an IB programme which is greatly valued in all around the world. In 2018, junior high school graduates needed a minimum of 8.10 GPA to be admitted to study at Tikkurila Upper Secondary.

TILU classifies its courses into different class groups that focus on specific subjects. Since 2009 there has been a mathematics and physical education group, in addition to a music group. The school also provides a variety of media and different languages courses including Latin and Japanese. TILU's friend-school is in Singapore and the schools arrange visits to one another's schools annually.

Tilu's principal is Mari Aalto

International Baccalaureate
In addition to the typical Finnish curriculum, TILU offers the IBDP, the International Baccalaureate Diploma Programme, with about ninety students in the school. TILU IB is one of the best IB schools in Finland offering a wide range of subjects for students with different aims and goals. In TILU, the IB subject choices are:

Group 1 - English A1/Finnish A1
Group 2 - English B/Finnish B
Group 3 - History/Philosophy/Psychology
Group 4 - Biology/Chemistry/Physics
Group 5 - Mathematics HL/SL/studies SL
Group 6 - Visual arts/additional subject from groups 3-4

In addition, the school also has a personal library for students to use, which other IB schools in Finland do not have. Our students are all-rounded and welcoming!

School Grounds
Library
Gym
Large lunch area
Large School Yard
Auditorium 
Lab 
Large study spaces

References

External links
home page

Schools in Finland
Vantaa
Education in Uusimaa
International Baccalaureate schools in Finland